Rebecca Louise Front (born 16 May 1964) is an English actress, writer and comedian. She won the 2010 BAFTA TV Award for Best Female Comedy Performance for The Thick of It (2009–2012). She is also known for her work in numerous other British comedies, including the radio show On The Hour (1992), The Day Today (1994), Knowing Me, Knowing You… with Alan Partridge (1994), Time Gentlemen Please (2000–2002), sketch show Big Train (2002), and Nighty Night (2004–2005).

Front has also been seen in a number of dramatic roles, including Chief Superintendent Jean Innocent in Lewis (2006–2014), Mrs. Bennet in Death Comes to Pemberley (2013), Mrs. Landau in The Eichmann Show (2015), Vera in Humans (2015), and Death in Paradise (2019). Her theatre credits include the musicals Company and The Fix at the Donmar Warehouse, directed by Sam Mendes.

Early life
Front was born in Stoke Newington, London, to Sheila and Charles Front. Her mother wrote children's books, which her father illustrated. Her father also designed the title-logo on the cover of The Beatles' album Rubber Soul. Her father is Jewish and her mother is of Jewish and Welsh descent. Front was brought up in Reform Judaism.

Front became involved in comedy while at St Hugh's College at the University of Oxford, where she read English and became the first female president of The Oxford Revue. She also trained at the Webber Douglas Academy of Dramatic Art.

Career
While at Oxford in 1984, Front took part in the revue Stop the Weak. The tour played in Oxford itself, the Gate Theatre, Notting Hill, Edinburgh, Salisbury, and Romsey. In 1985, Front teamed up with Sioned Wiliam and Jon Magnusson to take the show The Bobo Girls go BOO to Edinburgh. She made a short promotional video on energy conservation with Michael Simkins in the late 1980s. She achieved a higher profile as a result of her work with Stewart Lee and Richard Herring on the radio shows Lionel Nimrod's Inexplicable World and On the Hour, and the television and radio series Fist of Fun. She went on to form a close professional association with Chris Morris, Armando Iannucci, Doon Mackichan and Steve Coogan, who all transferred with Front to The Day Today, the television version of On the Hour. Completing The Day Today were Patrick Marber, who was part of the 1984 Oxford University revue with Front and David Schneider, who took part in the 1985 revue. This cast continued to contribute to the Alan Partridge comedy canon throughout the 1990s.

In recent years Front has also become a fixture on comedy panel shows on British television and radio including The News Quiz, Have I Got News for You and If I Ruled The World. She has also had minor roles in The Smell of Reeves and Mortimer, Absolute Power and Absolutely Fabulous and she has also played straight acting roles in television drama, including You Can Choose Your Friends, The Rotters' Club, Kavanagh QC, Lewis and Jonathan Creek.

In 2003, she was listed in The Observer as one of the 50 funniest acts in British comedy. From 2006, she has written columns for The Guardian. In 2007, she guest-starred in the Doctor Who audio drama The Mind's Eye. Between 2006 until 2014, Front had a recurring role as Chief Superintendent Jean Innocent on the detective drama series Lewis, the successor to Inspector Morse on ITV.

In 2009 and 2012, respectively, she appeared in the third and fourth series of political satire The Thick of It, playing Nicola Murray MP, Secretary of State for Citizenship and Social Affairs and in charge of the dysfunctional 'DoSAC', and later, Leader of the Opposition. Front featured in the 2010 BBC comedy series Grandma's House playing the part of Simon Amstell's mother Tanya, and Just William, as the mother of William Brown and also starred in the 2011 live-action 3D family comedy film Horrid Henry: The Movie as Henry's headmistress, Miss Oddbod.

In 2012 Front starred as the psychiatrist in the Sky Arts sketch series Psychobitches, where Front's character offers therapy to notable women of history and the present day, including Anne Boleyn, Mary Queen of Scots, Mary Shelley, Enid Blyton, Eva Braun, Mary Pickford, Edith Piaf, and Anna Nicole Smith. The series aired on the British television channel Sky Arts 1. The first episode of a second series was broadcast on 25 November 2014. In 2013, she starred in the new Sky Living comedy The Spa, in the role of Alison Crabbe. She plays Cox in The Wrong Mans, a six-part comedy-thriller for BBC Two. The premiere was on 24 September 2013. She reprised this role in December 2014 for a special two-parter. She narrated Fox Wars which was broadcast on 22 October 2013.

In December 2013, Sky Atlantic aired a new comedy series called Little Cracker. The second programme in the series was an autobiographical story written by Front and her brother Jeremy. It concerns the time she witnessed the near-drowning of her father in a lake; that incident was closely followed by the death of her grandfather. The proximity of these two experiences caused Front considerable personal anguish. Front was eleven years old at the time and, because of the trauma she suffered, she went through a period of not wanting to attend school. The programme included a comedic treatment of this time in her life, followed by Front and her brother explaining the background to the story, and how they came to write and dramatise it. In the programme, Front was played by Lucy Hutchinson, and her father was played by the actor Richard Lumsden. Samantha Spiro played her mother and Front played her headmistress, Miss Dyson. Front's school friend character, Karen, was played by Imogen Front.

For their Christmas season, the BBC commissioned Death Comes to Pemberley, a three-part British television drama based on characters created by Jane Austen in her novel Pride and Prejudice. The first episode aired on BBC One at 8.15pm on Boxing Day 2013, was based on the best selling novel by P. D. James, the story returns to the world of Jane Austen's Pride and Prejudice and involves its characters in a new tale of murder and emotional mayhem. Front played the part of Mrs Bennet.

In January 2014, Front appeared in the Midsomer Murders episode "Let Us Prey", about a serial killer who uses medieval torture methods to dispatch their victims. She appeared in the BBC series Outnumbered, playing the headmistress at Karen's school in early 2014. Front portrayed Fiona in the BBC Radio 4 series Love in Recovery. She also starred in the sitcom Up the Women as Helen Bute, the antagonist for three episodes in mid-2013 and a six-episode series in 2015. From 2014 to 2019, she narrated the Channel 4 series The Supervet.

In 2017, she co-wrote and appeared in the sitcom Shush! on BBC Radio 4, a sitcom set in a library.

Personal life

Front is married, with two children.

Front's book Curious: True Stories and Loose Connections (published 2014) is a collection of autobiographical stories.

Jeremy Front, her brother, is a writer and comic actor. They have collaborated on writing and performance projects. The most recent is a series of spoof documentaries, Incredible Women, for BBC Radio 4.

Filmography

Film

Television

Awards and nominations

References

External links

Rebecca Front on Twitter

1964 births
20th-century English actresses
21st-century English actresses
20th-century English Jews
21st-century English Jews
21st-century English memoirists
21st-century English women writers
Living people
Actresses from London
Writers from London
Alumni of St Hugh's College, Oxford
Alumni of the Webber Douglas Academy of Dramatic Art
Best Female Comedy Performance BAFTA Award (television) winners
British women memoirists
English comedy writers
English Jewish writers
English people of Welsh descent
English television actresses
English television writers
The Guardian journalists
Jewish English actresses
People from Stoke Newington
British women television writers